Niekursko  is a village in the administrative district of Gmina Trzcianka, within Czarnków-Trzcianka County, Greater Poland Voivodeship, in west-central Poland.

The village has a population of 387.

References

Niekursko